Chittar River and its five tributaries and numerous other contributing streams  originate in the Courtallam hills of Tenkasi District in the state of  Tamil Nadu in southern India. Together with its tributaries and streams, the Chittar River serves as an important source of irrigation for the region and is a major tributary of the Tambaraparani River along with the Manimuthar River.

Tributaries
The Chittar has several tributaries which include the Aintharuviar (joining near Gajamajorpuram), the Gundar which joins near Tenkasi, the Hanumanathi joining in Thayar Thoppu near Veerakeralampudur and the Aluthakanniar which merges in the village of Kadapagothi.

Irrigation
This pattern continues as each tributary and other contributing rivers  has anicuts and reservoirs that provide irrigation for the adjacent land.

It eventually joins with Thamirabarani river.

Notes

Rivers of Tamil Nadu
Rivers of India